Monroe County is a county located on the eastern border of the U.S. state of Ohio, across the Ohio River from West Virginia. As of the 2020 census, the population was 13,385, making it the second-least populous county in Ohio. Its county seat is Woodsfield. The county was created in 1813 and later organized in 1815.

History

Monroe County was formed on January 28, 1813, from portions of Belmont, Guernsey and Washington counties. It was named after James Monroe, the U.S. Secretary of State when the county was formed, and later fifth President of the United States. When organized, the county's eastern border was with the state of Virginia. This portion of the state seceded from Virginia during the American Civil War, being admitted to the Union as the state of West Virginia. The largely rural county reached its peak of population in the 19th century, before urbanization drew people into and near cities for work and other opportunities. It is still a center of Amish population and farms.

In 1891, West Virginia's Sistersville Field was discovered to extend into Monroe County.  By 1901, 300 wells near Woodsfield, Ohio, were producing 55,000 barrels of oil a month. 

On or about December 20, 2011, ExxonMobil, a New Jersey petroleum company, via its subsidiary XTO Energy, acquired 20,056 acres of Monroe County Utica Shale gas leases from Beck Energy.

Geography
It is bordered by the Ohio River to the east. The terrain is hilly in this area, with waterways cutting through some hills of the Appalachian Plateau, which extends from Lake Erie to the Ohio River, which flows southwest to the south of this county.

Adjacent counties
 Belmont County (north)
 Marshall County, West Virginia (northeast)
 Wetzel County, West Virginia (east)
 Tyler County, West Virginia (southeast)
 Washington County (south)
 Noble County (west)

Major highways

National protected area
 Wayne National Forest (part)

Demographics

2000 census
As of the census of 2000, there were 15,180 people, 6,021 households, and 4,413 families living in the county. The population density was 33 people per square mile (13/km2). There were 7,212 housing units at an average density of 16 per square mile (6/km2). The racial makeup of the county was 98.72% White, 0.26% Black or African American, 0.15% Native American, 0.07% Asian, 0.01% Pacific Islander, 0.11% from other races, and 0.67% from two or more races. 0.41% of the population were Hispanic or Latino of any race.

There were 6,021 households, out of which 29.50% had children under the age of 18 living with them, 61.70% were married couples living together, 8.10% had a female householder with no husband present, and 26.70% were non-families. 24.00% of all households were made up of individuals, and 11.50% had someone living alone who was 65 years of age or older. The average household size was 2.50 and the average family size was 2.96.

In the county, the population was spread out, with 23.60% under the age of 18, 7.10% from 18 to 24, 25.90% from 25 to 44, 27.20% from 45 to 64, and 16.30% who were 65 years of age or older. The median age was 41 years. For every 100 females there were 97.50 males. For every 100 females age 18 and over, there were 96.10 males.

The median income for a household in the county was $30,467, and the median income for a family was $36,297. Males had a median income of $33,308 versus $19,628 for females. The per capita income for the county was $15,096. About 11.00% of families and 13.90% of the population were below the poverty line, including 18.30% of those under age 18 and 11.40% of those age 65 or over.

2010 census
As of the 2010 United States Census, there were 14,642 people, 6,065 households, and 4,183 families living in the county. The racial makeup of the county was 98.1% white, 0.4% black or African American, 0.1% Asian, 0.1% American Indian, 0.1% from other races, and 1.2% from two or more races. Those of Hispanic or Latino origin made up 0.4% of the population. In terms of ancestry, 34.8% were German, 14.5% were Irish, 10.6% were English, and 9.6% were American.

Of the 6,065 households, 27.3% had children under the age of 18 living with them, 56.0% were married couples living together, 8.6% had a female householder with no husband present, 31.0% were non-families, and 27.3% of all households were made up of individuals. The average household size was 2.39 and the average family size was 2.87. The median age was 44.7 years.

The median income for a household in the county was $37,030 and the median income for a family was $43,261. Males had a median income of $39,261 versus $24,922 for females. The per capita income for the county was $18,738. About 12.3% of families and 17.3% of the population were below the poverty line, including 26.7% of those under age 18 and 12.3% of those age 65 or over.

Politics

As was typical for Appalachian counties, Monroe County voted Democratic in most elections -- all but 7 times from 1856 until 2008. In 2012, it voted Republican for the first time since 1972. In 2016, it took a sharp turn to the right, voting for Donald Trump by a large margin. In the 2014 gubernatorial election, Monroe was one of two counties to vote for Democrat Ed FitzGerald over Republican John Kasich (along with Athens County). However, in 2018 it voted for Republican Mike DeWine over Democrat Richard Cordray.

|}

Government

Monroe County has three County Commissioners who oversee the various County departments, similar to 85 of the other 88 Ohio counties. Current Commissioners are: Mick Schumacher (R), Bill Bolon (R), and Diane Burkhart (R).

Monroe County is served by the Monroe County District Library from its administrative offices in Woodsfield, Ohio; it also offers a bookmobile service.

In 2005, the library loaned more than 141,000 items to its 6,000 cardholders. Total holding are over 64,000 volumes with over 140 periodical subscriptions. This library is a member of the SOLO Regional Library System.

Education
Monroe County contains the following schools through the Switzerland of Ohio Local School District:
 Elementary Schools
 Beallsville Elementary School in Beallsville, Ohio
 River Elementary School in Hannibal, Ohio
 Skyvue Elementary School in Graysville, Ohio
 Woodsfield Elementary School in Woodsfield, Ohio
 St. Sylvester Central in Woodsfield, Ohio
 High Schools
 Monroe Central High School in Woodsfield, Ohio
 River High School in Hannibal, Ohio
 Beallsville High School in Beallsville, Ohio
 Career Center
 Swiss Hills Career Center in Woodsfield, Ohio

Communities

Villages

 Antioch
 Beallsville
 Clarington
 Graysville
 Jerusalem
 Lewisville
 Miltonsburg
 Stafford
 Wilson
 Woodsfield (county seat)

Townships

 Adams
 Benton
 Bethel
 Center
 Franklin
 Green
 Jackson
 Lee
 Malaga
 Ohio
 Perry
 Salem
 Seneca
 Summit
 Sunsbury
 Switzerland
 Washington
 Wayne

Census-designated places
 Hannibal
 Sardis

Unincorporated communities
 Cameron
 Duffy
 Fly
 Laings
 Malaga
 Rinard Mills
 Sardis
 Sycamore Valley

Ghost town
 Quarry

Notable people
 Philip Allen, member of the Wisconsin State Assembly.
 William C. Chynoweth. member of the Illinois House of Representatives
 Sam V. Stewart, Montana Supreme Court Justice and the sixth Governor of Montana.

See also
 National Register of Historic Places listings in Monroe County, Ohio
 Petroleum industry in Ohio

References

Further reading
 Thomas William Lewis, History of Southeastern Ohio and the Muskingum Valley, 1788-1928. In Three Volumes. Chicago: S.J. Clarke Publishing Co., 1928.

External links
 Monroe County Economic Development and Tourism
 Monroe County Public Library website

 
Appalachian Ohio
Counties of Appalachia
Ohio counties on the Ohio River
1815 establishments in Ohio
Populated places established in 1815